Rachel Gray (26 September 1930 - 19 January 2010) was an American former politician.

Gray was affiliated with the Democratic Party from her time as a member of the city council of High Point, North Carolina. As a city councilor, she served as liaison to the High Point Human Relations Commission, and as mayor pro-term. Gray began serving as a state legislator in 1977. In her tenure in the North Carolina Senate, during which she represented Guilford County, Gray supported the Equal Rights Amendment. However, Gray protested the lack of legislative process afforded to discussions on its ratification. She lost reelection to Wendell Sawyer during the 1984 state legislative elections. The next year, Gray considered running for the United States Senate, telling The Dispatch, a newspaper that previously reported speculation that she would not run served as "ice thrown on my candidacy."

References

Democratic Party North Carolina state senators
20th-century American politicians
20th-century American women politicians
Living people
People from High Point, North Carolina
Women state legislators in North Carolina
Women city councillors in North Carolina
1930 births